Dub Jones is the name of:

Dub Jones (American football), American football player
Dub Jones (singer), American singer